Katsumi Shibata (1909 – August 1942) was a Japanese field hockey player who competed in the 1932 Summer Olympics. In 1932 he was a member of the Japanese field hockey team, which won the silver medal. He played two matches as halfback. He was born in Tokyo, Japan and was killed in action during World War II.

References

External links
 
Katsumi Shibata's profile at databaseOlympics.com
Katsumi Shibata's profile at Sports Reference.com

1909 births
1942 deaths
Sportspeople from Tokyo
Japanese male field hockey players
Olympic field hockey players of Japan
Field hockey players at the 1932 Summer Olympics
Olympic silver medalists for Japan
Olympic medalists in field hockey
Medalists at the 1932 Summer Olympics
Japanese military personnel killed in World War II
20th-century Japanese people